Kaarel Kübar (before 1937 Karl-Eduard; 15 January 1907 – 28 May 2004) was an Estonian sport shooter.

He was born in Vara Rural Municipality, Tartu County.

He began his shooting career in 1933. He won 5 medals at 1939 ISSF World Shooting Championships. He was 4-times Estonian champion in different shooting disciplines. 1937–1939 he was a member of Estonian national sport shooting team.

1944–1954 he spent in a prison camp in Siberia. In 1955 he returned to Estonia.

In 2000 he was awarded Order of the White Star V Class.

He is buried at Rahumäe Cemetery in Tallinn.

References

1907 births
2004 deaths
Estonian male sport shooters
Recipients of the Order of the White Star, 5th Class
People from Peipsiääre Parish
Estonian prisoners and detainees
Gulag detainees
Burials at Rahumäe Cemetery